This is a list of carols performed at the Festival of Nine Lessons and Carols at King's College Chapel, Cambridge. The Festival is an annual church service held on Christmas Eve (24 December) at King's College Chapel in Cambridge, United Kingdom. The Nine Lessons, which are the same every year, are read by representatives of the college and of the City of Cambridge from the 1611 Authorized King James Version of the Bible.

The service is broadcast live in the United Kingdom on BBC Radio 4, and abroad on the BBC's overseas programmes as well; it is estimated that each year there are millions of listeners worldwide who listen to it live on the BBC World Service. In the UK, a recorded broadcast is also made on Christmas Day on BBC Radio 3. A television programme entitled Carols from King's which is pre-recorded in early or mid-December is shown on Christmas Eve in the UK on BBC Two and BBC Four.

Carols
In the table below, carols specially commissioned for the Choir of King's College Chapel are highlighted in green. To rearrange the table alphabetically or numerically by a particular column, click on the arrow symbol in the column heading.

See also
Anglican church music
Christmas carol

Notes

Further reading
.

External links
King's College Chapel's webpage about the service

Nine Lessons and Carols, King's College Chapel
Dynamic lists of songs
Anglican liturgy
Lists of songs
Anglicanism-related lists